The 1951–1952 St. Francis Terriers men's basketball team represented St. Francis College during the 1951–52 NCAA Division I men's basketball season. The team was coached by Daniel Lynch, who was in his fourth year at the helm of the St. Francis Terriers. The team was a member of the Metropolitan New York Conference. The Terriers played their home games at the Bulter Street Gymnasium in their Cobble Hill, Brooklyn campus and at the II Corps Artillery Armory in Park Slope, Brooklyn.

On February 2, 1952, against Seton Hall, the Terriers played in the first quadruple overtime game in New York City history, both collegiate and professional. The Terriers triumphed 82–70.

Roster

Schedule

|-
!colspan=12 style="background:#0038A8; border: 2px solid #CE1126;;color:#FFFFFF;"| Regular Season  

 

|-
!colspan=12 style="background:#0038A8; border: 2px solid #CE1126;;color:#FFFFFF;"| 1952 National Catholic Invitation Tournament

National Catholic Invitation Tournament
St. Francis, the defending champions was selected as the 4th seed in the NCIT. The tournament took place at Rensselaer Polytechnic Institute Field House in Troy, New York, from March 15 to March 22.

Awards

Vernon Stokes

All-Metropolitan Selection by the Metropolitan Basketball Writers Association

References

External links
 St. Francis Terriers men's basketball official website

St. Francis Brooklyn Terriers men's basketball seasons
St. Francis
Saint Francis
Saint Francis